The year 1950 was the 169th year of the Rattanakosin Kingdom of Thailand. It was the 5th year in the reign of King Bhumibol Adulyadej (Rama IX), and is reckoned as year 2493 in the Buddhist Era.

Incumbents
 King: Bhumibol Adulyadej 
 Regent: Rangsit Prayurasakdi, Phraya Manavaratsevi
 Crown Prince: (vacant)
 Prime Minister: Plaek Phibunsongkhram
 Supreme Patriarch: Vajirananavongs

Events

January

February

March

April
 28 April - His Majesty King Bhumibol Adulyadej married Mom Rajawongse Sirikit Kitiyakara in Lausanne.

May
 5 May - The Coronation of His Majesty the King of Thailand Bhumibol Adulyadej takes place at the Phaisan Thaksin Hall in Bangkok.

June

July

August

September

October

November

December

Births

Deaths

See also
 List of Thai films of 1950

References

External links

 
Years of the 20th century in Thailand
Thailand
Thailand
1950s in Thailand